Robert Downer (born 24 March 1992 in Portsmouth) is a professional squash player who represents England. He reached a career-high world ranking of World No. 106 in April 2021.

References

External links 

English male squash players
Living people
1992 births